"Addicted to You" is a song by LeVert, released as a single in 1988.  The single peaked at number one on the Billboard Black Singles chart for two weeks and was featured in the film, Coming to America.

References

1988 singles
1988 songs
Atlantic Records singles
LeVert songs
Songs written by Gerald Levert